The 2001 Clásica de Almería was the 16th edition of the Clásica de Almería cycle race and was held on 4 March 2001. The race started in Vícar and finished in Vera. The race was won by Tayeb Braikia.

General classification

References

2001
2001 in road cycling
2001 in Spanish sport